The 1957–58 Liga Leumit season lasted from December 1957 until May 1958. Maccabi Tel Aviv won the title, whilst the club's Rafi Levi was the league's top scorer with 14 goals.

There was no relegation from the league and no clubs were promoted from Liga Alef at the end of the season.

Final table

Results

References
Israel - List of Final Tables RSSSF

Liga Leumit seasons
Israel
1957–58 in Israeli football leagues